Corbeil is a commune in the Marne department in north-eastern France.

Margaret of Naples, daughter of Charles II of Naples and Maria of Hungary, married Charles de Valois, son of Philip III of France and Isabel of Aragon, on August 16, 1290, in Corbeil.

See also
Communes of the Marne department
Corbeil (disambiguation), for other places with this name

References

Communes of Marne (department)